Sahara Lotti (born June 3, 1977) is an Iranian-American CEO, Founder and inventor of Lashify, a luxury beauty company and “DIY lash extensions”. She was previously a screenwriter and actress

Background 
Raised in the San Francisco Bay Area in the town of Atherton, California. She attended Menlo-Atherton High School. After graduation, Lotti moved to Los Angeles and attended the University of Southern California (USC). In addition to her regular classes, Lotti studied with Hollywood acting coach, Ivana Chubbuck. Lotti also informally studied music and singing for numerous years, showing passion and talent for blues and jazz music.

Early career 
Lotti acted in a series of independent films. In 2001 she produced, wrote, directed and acted in a short comedy film, also starring Ashley Hamilton (son of George Hamilton and the stepson of Rod Stewart). The film was  co-executive produced by Balthazar Getty. According to The Hollywood Reporter she ventured into screenwriting after writing scenes for her acting classes. Her first writing project was sold to Universal Pictures.

According to The Hollywood Reporter, in March 2006, Lotti signed a two picture comedy deal with 20th Century Fox. Lotti caught the eye of Fox's President, Debbie Liebling (the executive responsible for the Sacha Baron Cohen comedy  Borat: Cultural Learnings of America for Make Benefit Glorious Nation of Kazakhstan, as well as Comedy Central's South Park), after Liebling read her script, A Family Affair. In  March 2006 she sold the comedy pitch to 20th Century Fox.  WishBoned  is being produced by Andrew Gunn,  producer of the Disney hit, Freaky Friday. Just one week later  Lotti sold 20th Century Fox the project, Back Magick. Shawn Levy (director of Night at the Museum) is attached to produce. In June 2010, The Hollywood Reporter announces that Lotti has been hired by CBS Films to adapt British best-seller "The Ex Files".

She is represented by International Creative Management (ICM).

Lashify 
In 2016, Lotti began developing the luxury beauty brand, Lashify, which holds over 175 patents and 50 trademarks worldwide. Lotti invented the cornerstone of the Lashify system: the internationally patented Gossamer lash and Fuse Control Wand. The patented technology behind the Lashify system allows for the Gossamer lash to be placed on the underside of the upper lash.  

Since Lashify's entry into the beauty world in 2018, it has garnered the attention of beauty editors at Vogue (magazine), Allure (magazine), Glamour (magazine), and Elle (magazine). Lotti's beauty brand has been used by the celebrity make-up artists. In 2019, Academy Award winning makeup artist, Vivian Baker, used Lashify in Charlize Theron's transformation to Megyn Kelly in the film, Bombshell (2019 film), winning the 92nd Academy Award for Best Makeup and Hairstyling.

Lotti is known to file lawsuits alleging infringement on her innovations and intellectual property. In May 2020, Lotti filed a lawsuit to alleging misuse of her patented technology. Lashify was the first female-owned beauty company to take legal action in China against competing manufacturers, marking the first time that an American beauty company has pursued such action within the Chinese legal system.  In August 2020, Lashify asked the International Trade Commission (ITC) to look into, what Lashify states, are unlawful importation of false lash systems. Lashify alleges these systems infringe on their patents, copying Lashify's technology without license. In October 2020, the International Trade Commission (ITC) launched the investigation into Lashify's patent-infringement complaint.

References
 December 2019 - 'Lashes, Lashes, Lashes: What it Took to Give the 'Bombshell' Women the Fox Look" The New York Times
 May 2020 - 'Lashify, The DIY Luxury Lash Extension System, Becomes The First Female Owned Beauty Company To Take Legal Action In China Against Knockoff Manufacturers' PR Newswire
 September 2020 - 'Commission to Look into 'Unlawful Importation' Women's Wear Daily
 October 2020 - 'Walmart, CVS Patent Claim by Lashify to be Probed by ITC' Bloomberg Law

Further reading
July 2010 - 'CBS Films Thinks Brit Novel Has Ex Factor'  Deadline
June 2010 - 'Writer Sahara Lotti hooking up with ‘Exes’ for CBS Films'  
 March 2006 - 'Fox Loves Sahara Lotti' Cinematical
 June 2006 - 'Affair' flair for New Line' Variety
 Universal Pictures picks up Freaks of the Jungle - Literary Sales
 Back Magick for Sahara Lotti & Shawn Levy Backstage 
 Hollywood.com
 Lover Girl Review - The New York Times
 December 2019 - 'Lashes, Lashes, Lashes: What it Took to Give the 'Bombshell' Women the Fox Look" The New York Times
 May 2020 - 'Lashify, The DIY Luxury Lash Extension System, Becomes The First Female Owned Beauty Company To Take Legal Action In China Against Knockoff Manufacturers' PR Newswire

 December 2021 - ‘The $145 secret to perfect lashes’ “US Weekly”

External links 

1977 births
Screenwriters from California
Living people
University of Southern California alumni
American women screenwriters
People from Atherton, California
21st-century American women